China–Switzerland relations officially began in 1918. Relations between the two nations have been excellent, particularly in economic affairs, although relations were somewhat strained during the ethnic Uyghurs controversy, and the Hong Kong National Security Law in June 2020.

History
Among the first Swiss visitors to China were Jesuit missionaries in the 17th century. Their watches were popular with the Qing court and as a result a few Swiss watchmakers began exporting watches to China. However, it was only with the popularity of chinoiserie in the 18th century that economic interest in China spread in Switzerland. In the 19th century, Swiss merchants and missionaries profited from informal imperialism in Switzerland and enjoyed the consular protection of other powers. Although the Swiss media tended to be critical of Western imperialism in China, even during the Boxer Rebellion and the Communist victory in the Chinese Civil War in 1949, most newspapers ignored Swiss involvement in it. With the establishment of diplomatic relations between Switzerland and the Republic of China in 1918, Swiss citizens were officially entitled to extraterritoriality and they formed part of the foreign community in the Chinese treaty ports, enjoying the same privileges as citizens of the imperial powers in China. Swiss exports to China included pocket and wrist watches, indigo, and textiles, while imports from China were dominated by silk and foodstuffs. After the Second World War, Swiss criticism of the Nationalist regime increased. Switzerland relinquished extraterritorial privileges in 1946 but relations between the two nations were distant, and Switzerland was more interested in protecting its economic interests in China than in supporting the Nationalists in the Chinese Civil War.  As a result, the Swiss government was the fifth Western nation to recognize the PRC on 17 January 1950.

Bilateral relations

Until China established diplomatic relations with France in 1964, Switzerland was the only country in central and southern Europe to have a Chinese Embassy. As a result, the PRC's Embassy in Bern and the Consulate in Geneva were in charge of China's political and economic relations with France, Italy, Germany, and other countries. China-Swiss economic relations have accelerated since Deng Xiaoping's economic reforms in the late 1970s. Switzerland's trade with China is not in deficit as other industrialized nations trade with China. Two way trade between the two countries is growing at an annual rate of 20–30 percent. In 2007, Swiss exports were valued at 5.4 billion Swiss francs or 5.36 billion US dollars. China is now Switzerland's top trading partner in Asia, ahead of Japan.

Swiss firms have been investing in China substantially over the last decade. There are approximately 300 Swiss firms with more than 700 branches operating in China with a total employment of 55,000 people. Chinese firms have a small but growing presence in Switzerland as a base to expand in Europe. Chinese firms are not only entering markets for basic consumer goods such as textiles and shoes but also for chemical intermediates, pharmaceuticals, high technology parts, and telecommunications.

In May 2013, during his official visit to the alpine nation, Chinese Premier Li Keqiang signed the first free trade agreement between the two countries worth more than 26 billion. Direct exports from Switzerland to China account for 22.8 billion in that deal, which was heralded as a "real milestone" by then Swiss President Ueli Maurer. Switzerland has a positive trade balance with China, and both countries are expected to profit from export guarantees, protection of intellectual property and financial cooperation between their largest banks. Switzerland thus became the first continental European country and the largest economy to conclude a free trade deal with China.

In January 2015, during the World Economic Forum, the Swiss National Bank and the People's Bank of China signed a memorandum of understanding on the establishment of renminbi clearing arrangements in Switzerland.

2020 

In June 2020, Switzerland openly opposed the Hong Kong national security law.

In September 2020, the Swiss Federal Intelligence Service wrote that:

In October 2020, Switzerland signed a joint statement on the human rights situation in Xinjiang and the recent developments in Hong Kong, delivered by Germany and denouncing China.

2021 
In August 2021, Chinese state media outlets including China Global Television Network, Shanghai Daily and Global Times had cited a so-called Swiss biologist Wilson Edwards as saying "the US is so obsessed with attacking China on the origin-tracing issue that it is reluctant to open its eyes to the data and findings". Swiss embassy in China responded by saying he likely did not exist, as there was no registry of a Swiss citizen with the name "Wilson Edwards" and no academic articles under the name.

2022 
In 2022, Switzerland called on China to close the Xinjiang internment camps where at least one million ethnic minority Uyghurs were reportedly being held.

Economic ties

Equity market
A "stock connect program" was approved in late July 2022 by Chinese and Swiss regulators. More than 10 Chinese companies will have access to the SIX Swiss Exchange through global depositary receipts (GDRs). The companies already raised about $1.5 billion for mainland China.

Trade

See also
 Diplomatic Documents of Switzerland
 List of diplomatic missions in Switzerland

References

External links
  Bilateral relations Switzerland–China (Swiss administration)
  Embassy of Switzerland in China
  Embassy of China in Switzerland

 
Switzerland
Bilateral relations of Switzerland